Miramar is a city near the southeastern tip of the state of  Tamaulipas in Mexico. It is the largest city in the municipality of Altamira and third largest of the Tampico Metropolitan Area. The city had a 2010 census population of 118,614, the seventh-largest community in the state, having passed Río Bravo since the previous census.

References
2010 census tables: INEGI: Instituto Nacional de Estadística, Geografía e Informática

Populated places in Tamaulipas